Bright Eyes / Squad Car 96 is a 1997 split EP with Bright Eyes and Squadcar 96.

Track listing
 "Racing Towards The New" – Bright Eyes
 "Go Find Yourself A Dry Place" – Bright Eyes
 "Dusk Soccer" – Squadcar 96
 "Verandahli Dotslap" – Squadcar 96

Credits
Bass – Dave O'Halloran (tracks: B1, B2)
Clarinet – Christina Paskulich (tracks: B1, B2)
Drums – Carl Guy (tracks: B1, B2), Tim Kasher (tracks: A1, A2)
Flute – Pugsley B. Wateringcan (tracks: B1, B2)
Guitar – Matthew Sullivan (2) (tracks: B1, B2)
Guitar, Vocals – Andrew Sousa (tracks: B1, B2), Conor Oberst (tracks: A1, A2)
Mixed By – Benton Silla (tracks: B1, B2), Squadcar 96 (tracks: B1, B2)
Recorded By – Benton Silla (tracks: B1, B2), Conor Oberst (tracks: A1, A2)

Notes
The 7-inch vinyl has been seen to sell for over US$2000.
Only 150 copies were pressed

Bright Eyes (band) EPs
Split EPs
1997 EPs